ABXplore is a private commercial thematic television channel of the French Community of Belgium operated by Mediawan Thematics.

History
On September 13, 2017, AB Groupe decided to rename AB4 by becoming ABXplore, and reformat it into a channel devoted to documentaries called entertainment for a public aged 15 to 49.

Programming
Focused on adventure and entertainment, ABXplore will appeal to all lovers of adrenaline, true emotions and strong stories.

ABXplore offers an unprecedented offer in the French-speaking Belgian landscape: a 100% factual entertainment positioning consisting of innovative documentary programs, rooted in reality but always incisive and rhythmic, embodied by genuine and charismatic personalities. ABXplore renews the documentary genre under the sign of entertainment.

Every evening, at 8 pm, the program will be devoted to one of the following themes: Adventure, Technology, History, Automotive, Extreme Crafts or Science.

References

External links
 

Television channels in Belgium
Television channels and stations established in 2017
French-language television stations in Belgium
2017 establishments in Belgium
Companies based in Brussels